"Victorious" is a song by American rock band Panic! at the Disco released as the second single from the band's fifth studio album, Death of a Bachelor, on September 29, 2015 by Fueled by Ramen and DCD2. The song was written by Brendon Urie, CJ Baran, Mike Viola, White Sea, Jake Sinclair, Alex DeLeon, and Rivers Cuomo and was produced by Sinclair with additional production by Suzy Shinn. A music video for the song was released on YouTube on November 13, 2015. It was the final song released during Dallon Weekes's tenure in the band, though it was never confirmed if he played bass on the single. Notably, "Victorious" was the band's first single in almost 10 years to chart on Billboard Pop Songs chart, since 2006's "I Write Sins Not Tragedies".

Music video
The music video for "Victorious" was released onto Fueled by Ramen's official YouTube page on November 13, 2015. It was directed by Brandon Dermer. The video depicts Panic! at the Disco's lead vocalist Brendon Urie in a boxing match against a large brute, and winning. However, after not calling his girlfriend, she breaks up with him. He loses his self esteem, but wins a large check for it. He then becomes the victor in more situations, such as helping an elderly lady across the street, and despite losing a dodgeball game, taking home a young lady. As of December 2022, the music video has over 79 million views.

Charts

Weekly charts

Year-end charts

Certifications

Release history

References

Notes
  credited as an additional producer.

2015 singles
2015 songs
Fueled by Ramen singles
Panic! at the Disco songs
Songs written by Brendon Urie
Songs written by Morgan Kibby
Songs written by Mike Viola
Songs written by Rivers Cuomo
Songs written by Jake Sinclair (musician)
Songs written by CJ Baran